He Dies in Rocket School is a remix album from nerdcore band Optimus Rhyme, released July 3, 2007. The tracks are all from their previous album School the Indie Rockers and remixed by various nerdcore artists.

Track listing
 "My Piroshky (Reprise)" [Jacob London Remix] - 1:07
 "Obey The Moderator" [Stenobot Remix] - 3:12
 "Sick Day" [John Fewell Remix] - 3:35
 "Autobeat Airbus" [Brobot 'Autobus' Remix] - 1:58
 "Extinguish" [Baddd Spellah Remix] - 0:26
 "Coded And United" [Karl Olson 'Ultraklystron' Remix] - 3:54
 "Ping Pong Song" [Baddd Spellah Remix Ft. MC Frontalot And DJ Snyder] - 4:55
 "LEDs" [Emc & DJ Addonis Remix] - 4:05
 "Super Shiny Metal" [B-One Remix] - 5:10
 "Just Forget It" [Passive Consumer 'Heavy Conscious' Remix] - 3:24
 "My Piroshky" [Mercir 'Experimental Beats' Remix] - 3:34
 "Who Me?" [Jacob London Remix] - 1:37
 "Ergonomic" [Brobot 'Ergonomad' Remix] - 29:45 (Contains 2 tracks with lengths around 7:15 and 11:45 separated by 10:45 minutes of silence.)

Personnel
Wheelie Cyberman – lead vocals
Powerthighs – guitar
Stumblebee – bass
Grimrock – drums

Optimus Rhyme albums
2007 albums